The BCS National Championship Game, or BCS National Championship, was a postseason college football bowl game, used to determine a national champion of the NCAA Division I Football Bowl Subdivision (FBS), first played in the 1998 college football season as one of four designated bowl games, and beginning in the 2006 season as a standalone event rotated among the host sites of the aforementioned bowls.

The game was organized by a group known as the Bowl Championship Series, consisting of the Rose Bowl, Sugar Bowl, Fiesta Bowl, and Orange Bowl, which sought to match the two highest-ranked teams in a championship game to determine the best team in the country at the end of the season. The participating teams were determined by averaging the results of the final weekly Coaches' Poll, the Harris Poll of media, former players and coaches, and the average of six computer rankings. The Coaches' Poll was contractually required to name the winner of the game as its No. 1 team on the final postseason ranking; hence, the AFCA National Championship Trophy was presented to the winning team during a post-game ceremony.

The methodologies of the BCS system and its selections proved to be controversial. Although in most years the winner of the BCS National Championship would also be designated as the national champion by other organizations and polls (such as the Associated Press poll), the 2003 season was a major exception, as the BCS rankings chose the AP's No. 3-ranked team, the University of Oklahoma, over the No. 1-ranked team in that poll, the University of Southern California, to participate in the national title game (the Sugar Bowl) despite Oklahoma's loss to Kansas State University in the 2003 Big 12 Championship Game. That was the only season during the BCS era when the national championship was split, with Louisiana State University winning the BCS national championship and the University of Southern California winning the AP national championship, plus the football writers' national championship.

The BCS National Championship Game was played for the final time in 2013 after the same organizing group established a new system, the College Football Playoff, a four-team single elimination tournament, as the successor to the BCS.

History

The first BCS Championship was played at the conclusion of the 1998 college football season in accordance with an agreement by the Big Ten Conference, the  Pac-10 Conference, and the Rose Bowl Game to join the  "Bowl Alliance" system.  The expanded format was called the Bowl Championship Series.

The Bowl Alliance and its predecessor, the Bowl Coalition, featured championship games in the 1992–1997 seasons. However, these could not always ensure a matchup between the top two ranked teams because of the lack of participation by the Big Ten and Pac-10.

The BCS National Championship Game was initially rotated among the four participating bowl games: the Fiesta Bowl, Sugar Bowl, Orange Bowl, and Rose Bowl.  However, beginning with the 2006 season, the BCS National Championship Game was added as a separate contest, played after New Year's Day.  The game rotated its location among the Fiesta, Sugar, Orange, and Rose venues.

Game results
For Bowl Coalition championship game results from 1992–1994, see: Bowl Coalition
For Bowl Alliance championship game results from 1995–1997, see: Bowl Alliance

† USC later vacated its win in the 2005 Orange Bowl and loss in the 2006 Rose Bowl 

^Notre Dame's loss in the 2012 BCS national title game was later vacated due to the use of Ineligible players

.

Records by team

† USC vacated its win in the 2005 Orange Bowl.

Records by conference

Note: Conference affiliations are contemporaneous with the game, which may differ from the current alignment.

* The American Athletic Conference was known as the Big East during the 1991–2012 seasons. Because of a split between the non-FBS schools and FBS schools, the conference adopted its present name for the 2013 season.

** Alabama defeated fellow SEC member LSU in the 2012 BCS Championship Game, resulting in both a win and loss for the conference.

† USC vacated its win in the 2005 Orange Bowl.

Game records

MVPs

Heisman Trophy winners in BCS title games

Criticisms and controversy

Critics of the BCS National Championship argued against the internal validity of a so-called national championship being awarded to the winner of a single postseason game. Critics lamented that the participants were selected based upon polls, computer rankings, popularity and human biases, and not by on-field competition, as in other major sports and all other levels of college football, which employed tournament-format championships. Often, the BCS system led to controversies in which multiple teams finished the season with identical records, and voters distinguished the worthiness of their participation in the BCS National Championship with no set of formal criteria or standards. The end of the 2010 season was one of the best examples of this. Without any objective criteria for evaluation of the teams, the BCS forced voters to impose their own standards and tiebreakers. Critics noted that the system inherently fostered selection bias, and therefore lacked both internal validity and external validity.

Controversies surrounding teams' inclusion in the BCS National Championship Game were numerous. In 2001, Oregon, ranked second in the AP poll, was bypassed in favor of Nebraska despite Nebraska's 62-36 blowout to Colorado in its final regular season game. In 2003, USC was not included in the championship game, but beat Michigan in the Rose Bowl and ended up No. 1 in the final AP poll. The following season, undefeated Auburn, Boise State, and Utah teams were left out of the national title game (the Orange Bowl). In 2008, Utah was excluded from the BCS championship for a second time despite being the only undefeated FBS team and finished second in the final AP poll behind Florida. In 2009, five schools finished the regular season undefeated: Alabama, Texas, Cincinnati, TCU, and Boise State; however, the BCS formula selected traditional powers Alabama and Texas to participate in the BCS National Championship Game.

In 2010, three teams, Oregon, Auburn, and TCU, all finished the year with undefeated records. While TCU statistically led the other two teams in all three major phases of the game (1st in defense, 14th in offense  and 13th in special teams ) the teams from the two automatic qualifying conferences, Oregon (Pac-12) and Auburn (SEC), were selected over the Horned Frogs for the 2011 national title game. Many voters cited TCU's membership in the non-automatic qualifying Mountain West Conference, perceived as having weaker teams, as one significant reason for their exclusion, despite TCU's undefeated regular-season records in both 2010 and the previous year. Adding to the controversy were comments made by the president of Ohio State University, Gordon Gee, who said that teams which played "the little sisters of the poor" instead of the "murderer's row" of teams in the automatic qualifier conferences did not deserve any national title game consideration. Gee retracted his statement and apologized after TCU defeated Wisconsin in the 2011 Rose Bowl (the Badgers had convincingly defeated Ohio State during the regular season).

Many critics of the Bowl Championship Series favored a tournament with eight to sixteen teams, similar to those administered by the NCAA for its Football Championship Subdivision (FCS), Division II, and Division III football championships. Others favored adopting the incremental step of adding a single post-bowl championship game between the winners of two BCS games among the top four ranked teams in the BCS standings, a so-called "plus one" option. On June 24, 2009, the BCS presidential oversight committee rejected the Mountain West Conference's proposed eight-team playoff plan.

In 2009, the NCAA ruled that former USC running back Reggie Bush was retroactively ineligible for the 2004 BCS National Championship, the 2005 Orange Bowl vs. Oklahoma, for receiving various illegal benefits.  In May 2011, the NCAA rejected all appeals of USC's penalties, which included Bush's ineligibility and a two-year bowl ban.  On June 6, 2011, USC became the first school to lose a Bowl Championship Series national title due to NCAA sanctions when the BCS presidential oversight committee stripped the school of its 2004 title.  As a result, there is no 2004 BCS champion, although USC retained its 2004 AP national title. Additionally, the BCS also nullified USC's participation in the 2006 Rose Bowl. (See attributions 1 and 2.)

Future
During 2012, the BCS actively considered changes to the format for the 2014 football season, to either to extend the season by one game by establishing a four-school semifinal round or by selecting the participants in the national championship game after the season's bowl games were completed.  On June 26, 2012, the BCS presidential oversight committee approved a four-school playoff format, in which the participants are determined by a selection committee.  The semifinals are played as existing bowl games on or around New Year's Eve and New Year's Day. The championship game is played approximately a week later at a neutral site selected through a competitive bidding process.
  The new format, known as the College Football Playoff began with 2014 college football season and is scheduled through the 2025 season.

Media coverage

Television
From 1999 through 2005, ABC broadcast eight BCS National Championship Games pursuant to broadcasting rights negotiated with the BCS and the Rose Bowl, whose rights were offered separately. Beginning with the 2006 season, FOX obtained the BCS package, consisting of the Orange Bowl, Fiesta Bowl, Sugar Bowl, and the BCS National Championship Games hosted by these bowls, with ABC retaining the rights to the Rose Bowl and BCS National Championship Games hosted by the Rose Bowl.

On November 18, 2008, the BCS announced that ESPN had won the television rights to the BCS National Championship Game, as well as the other four BCS bowls, for 2011–2014.

Spanish
As part of ESPN's contract with the BCS, ESPN Deportes provided the first Spanish-language U.S. telecast of the BCS National Championship Game in 2012.

Radio
From 1999 to 2014, the BCS National Championship Game was broadcast on ESPN Radio.

Related national championship selections

During the BCS era, there was no NCAA Division I FBS playoff, and the BCS National Championship Game was just one of several national championship selection processes in existence.

The American Football Coaches Association (AFCA) participated in a weekly Coaches' Poll published by USA Today; for its final poll of the season, the AFCA was contractually bound to select the BCS National Champion as its No. 1 team. Thus, the winner of the game was awarded the AFCA National Championship Trophy in a postgame ceremony.

The BCS National Champion was also automatically awarded the National Football Foundation's MacArthur Bowl.

The Associated Press and the Football Writers Association of America were independent of the BCS system; their national championship trophies could have been awarded to a school other than the BCS National Championship Game winner.

References

External links

 

 
College sports championships in the United States
Recurring events disestablished in 2014